Sir John Keane, 1st Baronet (21 May 1757 – 19 April 1829), was an Irish Tory politician.

He was a Member of Parliament (MP) in the Parliament of Ireland for Bangor from 1790 to 1797 and for Youghal from 1798 until the Act of Union of 1800. He continued as MP for Youghal in the new enlarged Parliament of the United Kingdom until the United Kingdom general election of 1806.

He was made a baronet in 1801.

Personal life
Keane married Sarah, daughter of John Kelly, and they had at least three sons, including John and Edward, who was aide-de-camp to Major-general Sir Hussey Vivian at the Battle of Waterloo.

References
 (Biography of his son.)

Notes

External links 
 

1757 births
1829 deaths
Baronets in the Baronetage of Ireland
Tory MPs (pre-1834)
Politicians from County Cork
19th-century Irish people
Irish MPs 1790–1797
Irish MPs 1798–1800
Members of the Parliament of Ireland (pre-1801) for County Cork constituencies
Members of the Parliament of Ireland (pre-1801) for County Down constituencies
UK MPs 1801–1802
UK MPs 1802–1806
UK MPs 1807–1812
UK MPs 1812–1818
Members of the Parliament of the United Kingdom for County Cork constituencies (1801–1922)